

Events 
 6-year-old Mozart and his older sister Nannerl perform before Maximilian III Joseph, Elector of Bavaria, in Munich and the Empress Maria Theresa of Austria in Vienna.
 Johann Christian Bach begins composing for the King's Theatre in London; here he meets Carl Friedrich Abel for the first time. He will spend the remaining 20 years of his life in the city.
 Michael Haydn moves to Salzburg to become Konzertmeister to the Archbishop.
 Death of Le Riche de La Pouplinière, patron of Jean-Philippe Rameau, Johann Stamitz and François-Joseph Gossec.
 The first public concert with a glass harmonica is performed by Marianne Davies.

Popular music

Classical music 
Carl Friedrich Abel – Six Overtures in 8 Parts, Op. 4 (London)
Johann Albrechtsberger – Passione Domini
Carl Philipp Emanuel Bach 
L'Aly Rupalich, H.95
Harpsichord Concerto in C minor, H.448
Sonatina in D major, H.449
Solo für die Harfe H.563 Wq.139
 Wilhelm Friedemann Bach – Trio in B-flat major, F.50
Franz Ignaz Beck – 6 Symphonies, Op. 3
Michel Corrette – 6 Symphonies en Quatuor sur les Noëls
Francesco Geminiani – The Second Collection of Pieces for the Harpsichord (London, arrangements by the composer from Opp.1, 2, 4, 5, 7, and treatises on the violin and the guitar)
Joseph Haydn 
Horn Concerto No.1 in D major, Hob.VIId:3
Baryton Trio in G major, Hob.XI:116
Symphony No. 9 in C major, Hob.I:9
Louis Antoine Lefebvre – Andromède (secular cantata)
Leopold Mozart – Sacrament Litany in D
Wolfgang Amadeus Mozart
Minuet in F for Piano, K. 2
Allegro in B♭ for Piano, K. 3
Minuet in F for Piano, K. 4
Minuet in F for Piano, K. 5
Georg Philipp Telemann – Christmas Oratorio

Opera 
Thomas Arne – Artaxerxes
Johann Christian Bach – Alessandro nell'Indie, W.G 3
Domenico Cimarosa – La Cleopatra
Baldassare Galuppi – Antigono
Christoph Willibald Gluck – Orfeo ed Euridice
Johann Adolf Hasse – Il Trionfo di Clelia
Pierre-Alexandre Monsigny – Le Roi et le Fermier
Johann Gottlieb Naumann – Il tesoro insidiato
Niccolò Piccinni – Il Finto Turco
Giuseppe Sarti – Didone Abbandonata

Methods and theory writings 

 Carl Philipp Emanuel Bach – , Part II
 François Clément – 
 William Riley – Parochial Music Corrected
 Antonio Soler –  (Madrid: Joachin Ibarra)

Births 
January 20 – Jérôme-Joseph de Momigny, composer (died 1842)
January 21 – Giuseppe Antonio Silvani, composer
February 2 – Girolamo Crescentini, composer and castrato (died 1846)
February 19 – Friedrich Franz Hurka, composer
March 13 – Anine Frölich, ballet dancer (d. 1784)
March 24 – Marcos Antonio da Fonseca, Portugal, opera composer
March 25 – Francesco Giuseppi Pollini, composer
April 4 – Stephen Storace, composer  (died 1796)
April 13 – Karl Friedrich Horn, composer
April 26 – Shyama Shastri, composer (died 1827)
June 24 – Johann Paul Wessely, composer
July 4 – Marco Santucci, composer
July 20 – Jakob Haibel, composer
August 10 – Santiago Ferrer, composer
October 15 – Samuel Adams Holyoke, composer (died 1820)
December 25 – Michael Kelly, editor and tenor (died 1826)
December 26 – Franz Wilhelm Tausch, composer
unknown date
Giovanna Bassi, ballet dancer
Michel Dieulafoy, French librettist (died 1823)
Christina Fredenheim, singer and member of the Swedish Royal Academy of Music (died 1841)

Deaths 
January 13 – Leonhard Trautsch, composer
February 11 – Johann Tobias Krebs, composer (born 1690)
February 12 – Laurent Belissen, composer (born 1693)
c. March 25 – Johann Christian Schickhardt, German composer (born c. 1682)
April 2 – Vincenzo Legrenzio Ciampi, Italian composer (born 1719)
April 23 – Johann Samuel Endler, composer (born 1694)
May 16 – Ernst Christian Hesse, composer (born 1676)
May 24 – Joseph Umstatt, composer (born 1711)
June 19 – Johann Ernst Eberlin, composer (born 1702)
July 5 – Jakob Adlung, organist, instrument maker, music theorist and historian (born 1699)
July 16 – Jacques-Martin Hotteterre, composer (born 1674)
July 20 – Christoph Nichelmann, harpsichordist and composer (born 1717)
July 30 – Johann Valentin Görner, German composer (born 1702)
September 17 – Francesco Geminiani, violinist and composer (born 1687)
October 6 – Francesco Manfredini, composer (born 1684)
November 25 – Jacques-Christophe Naudot, flautist and composer (born c.1690)

References

 
18th century in music
Music by year